José Oscar "Turu" Flores Bringas (born 16 May 1971) is an Argentine retired professional footballer who played as a striker, and is a manager.

He started his professional career with Vélez Sarsfield in his native country, winning seven titles during the club's successful 1990s era. He then spent the following eight years in Spain – 194 league matches and 61 goals both major levels combined, mainly with Deportivo – and also played twice for the Argentina national team.

Playing career
Born in Buenos Aires, Flores started his career with Club Atlético Vélez Sarsfield in 1990, going on to play a major part in their most successful era in the mid-1990s. During his time at the club he won seven major titles, including three national championships, the 1994 edition of the Copa Libertadores and the Intercontinental Cup.

In 1996, Flores joined UD Las Palmas in the Spanish second division for a then-record sum spent by any club in that tier, 500 million pesetas. He scored 21 goals in his second season, helping the Canary Islands team qualify for the promotion/relegation playoffs, eventually lost to Real Oviedo (4–3 on aggregate).

After his performances, Flores joined Deportivo de La Coruña also in the country, alongside teammate Manuel Pablo. He formed an efficient striker partnership with Portuguese Pauleta first and Dutch Roy Makaay after, as the Galicians won the first La Liga title in their history in 2000; on 6 February of that year, he only needed 21 minutes on the pitch after coming on as a substitute for Djalminha to contribute to a 5–2 home crushing of Real Madrid.

Flores then played for Real Valladolid, RCD Mallorca and Ciudad de Murcia – the latter in the second level – with very little impact. In 2004, the 33-year-old returned to Argentina with Club Atlético Independiente.

In 2006, while at Club Atlético Aldosivi in his homeland's division two, Flores announced his retirement from football only to join Lyn Fotball in Norway in March of the following year, being joined in that adventure by compatriot Matías Almeyda. While with the Oslo side he only played 45 minutes of a first-round cup match, and retired altogether shortly after.

Coaching career
Flores returned to Vélez in 2009, being appointed Ricardo Gareca's assistant coach. On 26 December 2013, he became the manager.

Honours

Player
Vélez
Argentine Primera División: 1993 Clausura, 1995 Apertura, 1996 Clausura
Copa Libertadores: 1994
Intercontinental Cup: 1994
Copa Interamericana: 1994
Supercopa Sudamericana: 1996

Deportivo
La Liga: 1999–2000
Supercopa de España: 2000

Mallorca
Copa del Rey: 2002–03

Manager
Vélez
Supercopa Argentina: 2013

References

External links
 Vélez official profile 
 Argentine League statistics at Fútbol XXI 
 
 

1971 births
Living people
Argentine people of Spanish descent
Footballers from Buenos Aires
Argentine footballers
Association football forwards
Argentine Primera División players
Primera Nacional players
Club Atlético Vélez Sarsfield footballers
Club Atlético Independiente footballers
Aldosivi footballers
La Liga players
Segunda División players
UD Las Palmas players
Deportivo de La Coruña players
Real Valladolid players
RCD Mallorca players
Ciudad de Murcia footballers
Lyn Fotball players
Argentina international footballers
Argentine expatriate footballers
Argentine expatriate sportspeople in Spain
Expatriate footballers in Spain
Argentine expatriate sportspeople in Norway
Expatriate footballers in Norway
Argentine football managers
Argentine Primera División managers
Club Atlético Vélez Sarsfield managers
Defensa y Justicia managers